Leonard Schwartz may refer to:
 Leonard Schwartz (poet)
 Leonard Schwartz (tennis)